Louise Court (born 1960) is a British journalist and former editor of the UK edition of Cosmopolitan. She appeared in the video for Men Without Hats' song "The Safety Dance".

Early life
Court was born in south-west London. Her father was news editor on the Daily Mail and Sunday Mirror. In 1983, she starred in the video for the single "The Safety Dance" by Men Without Hats, but her identity in the video was unknown to the public until 2013.

Career
Court's early journalism career included work as an entertainment writer at Express Newspapers, deputy editor of Prima, and assistant editor of Woman's Own. In 1994, she joined Best magazine as deputy editor, becoming editor in 1998. In 2005, she worked for ACP-NatMag, overseeing Best, Reveal and Real People.

She became the editor of Cosmopolitan (UK) in November 2006. She was editor of Cosmopolitan until July 2015. As of 2018, she is consultant director of commercial content for Time, Inc.

Personal life
She has two sons.

References

External links
 Hearst UK

1960 births
British magazine editors
Cosmopolitan (magazine) people
Daily Express people
Women magazine editors
Living people